Diplomatic relations between the Argentine Republic and Hungary have existed for decades. Argentina is host to one of the largest Hungarian communities outside of Hungary. There are approximately 30,000 to 40,000 Argentines of Hungarian descent. Both nations are members of the United Nations.

History

In 1864, Argentina and the Austro-Hungarian Empire established diplomatic relations. In 1870, Argentina and the Kingdom of Hungary signed a Treaty of Friendship, Commerce and Navigation.

Beginning in the late 1920, thousands of Hungarians immigrated to Argentina, primarily settling in Buenos Aires. From the 1920s there was a continuous immigration to Argentina from Hungary and from the regions populated by Hungarians that were lost in the Treaty of Trianon. In 1923 Argentina became the first Latin American nation to recognize Hungarian independence and the first to re-establish diplomatic relations in June 1949. Soon after World War II, many Hungarians of Jewish origin immigrated to Argentina. Economic migrants from Hungary were followed by those fleeing for political reasons to Argentina as early as the 1930s, but especially after 1945.

In 1992, Hungarian Foreign Minister, Géza Jeszenszky, paid a visit to Argentina. In March 1993, Argentine Foreign Minister, Guido Di Tella, paid an official visit to Hungary. In April 1997, Hungarian President, Árpád Göncz, paid an official visit to Argentina, becoming the first Hungarian head-of-government to do so. During his visit, he met with Argentine President, Carlos Menem.

In October 2016, Hungarian Deputy Prime Minister, Zsolt Semjén, paid a visit to Argentina to commemorate the founding of the first Hungarian community in Argentina and to commemorate the 60th anniversary of the Hungarian Revolution of 1956.

High-level visits

High-level visits from Argentina to Hungary
 Foreign Minister Guido Di Tella (1993)

High-level visits from Hungary to Argentina
 Minister of Trade István Szurdi (1967)
 Deputy Prime Minister Lajos Faluvégi (1982)
 Foreign Minister Péter Veress (1986)
 Chairman Károly Németh (1987)
 Foreign Minister Géza Jeszenszky (1992)
 Foreign Minister László Kovács (1997)
 President Árpád Göncz (1997)
 Foreign Minister Péter Balázs (2010)
 Foreign Minister János Martonyi (2012)
 State Secretary for Foreign Affairs Péter Szijjártó (2013)
 Deputy Prime Minister Zsolt Semjén (2016)

Bilateral agreements
Both nations have signed several bilateral agreements such as a Treaty of Friendship, Commerce and Navigation (1870); Agreement of trade and financial cooperation (1948); Agreement of exchange of information for the control of goods and means of transport (1997); Agreement of cooperation in fighting illicit traffic of merchandise (1997); Agreement of mutual aid in the collection of customs debt (1997); Agreement of Cooperation in Education (2013); and an Agreement for Economic Cooperation (2015).

Resident diplomatic missions
 Argentina has an embassy in Budapest.
 Hungary has an embassy in Buenos Aires.

See also
 Hungarian Argentines
 Argentina–European Union relations

References 

Hungary
Argentina